General elections were held in Argentina on 2 April 1916. Voters elected the President, legislators, and local officials. The first secret-ballot presidential elections in the nation's history, they were mandatory and had a turnout of 62.8%. The turnout for the Chamber of Deputies election was 65.9%.

Background

President Roque Sáenz Peña kept his word to the exiled leader of the Radical Civic Union (UCR), Hipólito Yrigoyen, who in turn abandoned his party's twenty-year-old boycott of elections. The president overcame nearly two years of conservative opposition in Congress (and pressure from his own social class) to pass in 1912 what was later known as the Sáenz Peña Law, which mandated universal male suffrage and the secret ballot. His health deteriorating quickly, the President lived to see the fruition of his reforms: the 1914 mid-term elections, which gave the UCR 19 out of the 60 Lower House seats in play (the ruling party obtained 10) and the governorship of Santa Fe Province (then the second-most important). Another beneficiary of the Sáenz Peña Law was the Socialist Party, led by Congressman Juan B. Justo. The formerly dominant PAN remained divided between the Conservative Party, led by the Governor of Buenos Aires Province, Marcelino Ugarte, and the Democratic Progressive Party, led by a reformist publisher and Congressman, Lisandro de la Torre.

Strengthened by both popular appeal and the fractiousness of its opposition, the UCR experienced dissent within from its Santa Fe Province chapter, whose endorsement Yrigoyen was unable to obtain. The Socialists lost one of its best-known lawmakers, Alfredo Palacios, who would run on a splinter Socialist ticket for several future elections. The Conservative Party's presumptive nominee, Governor Ugarte, stepped aside in favor of a lesser-known party figure, San Juan Province Governor Ángel Rojas, in a bid to attract votes from the hinterland and from moderates. President Victorino de la Plaza refused to interfere on behalf of the Conservatives (despite an assassination attempt that would have provided him with ample pretext). Refusing to back them, he fielded his own Provincial Party, which was limited mainly to his native Santiago del Estero Province. Faced with only token opposition from the remnants of the once-paramount PAN, Yrigoyen pledged to donate his salary to charity, if elected, and encouraged the rich country's impoverished majority to know him as "the father of the poor." 

Election day, April 2, handed an unexpectedly large victory to Yrigoyen, who still had to await the results from the electoral college (which met in July). The dissident Santa Fe UCR had drained a significant number of electors from the official ticket, and Yrigoyen obtained but 133 of the body's 300 electors. Numerous Democratic Progressives, moreover, became faithless electors - pledging their support to the Conservative Party. Santa Fe's UCR, however, resorted to the same tactic, allowing Yrigoyen its 19 electors and making the patient activist for voter rights the first democratically elected President of Argentina.

Candidates
 Radical Civic Union (populist): President of the UCR Hipólito Yrigoyen of the city of Buenos Aires
 Conservative Party (conservative): Gobernor Ángel Rojas of San Juan Province 
 Democratic Progressive Party (reformist): Deputy Lisandro de la Torre of Santa Fe Province
 Socialist Party: Deputy Juan B. Justo of the city of Buenos Aires

President

Popular Vote

Electoral Vote

Electoral Vote by Province

Chamber of Deputies

References

1916
1916 elections in South America
1916 in Argentina
1916